Harivara Vipra (Assamese:হৰিবৰ বিপ্ৰ) is amongst the earliest known Assamese writers. He was patronaged by Kamatapur's king Durlava Narayan (14th Century). His compositions, Babrubahanar Yudha, Lava-Kushar Yudha, Tamradwajar Yudha of (Asvamedha Parva) are taken from Jyimiyanashamedh. His writing style, simple interpretation  and use of ornamental words are counted after his concurrent Madhava Kandali's. His other concurrent Pre-Vaishnavite writers are Rudra Kandali, Kobiranta Saraswati, Madhav Kandali, Hema Saraswati etc., who gave a strong initial base to Assamese Literature.

References

Poets from Assam
14th-century Indian poets
Assamese-language poets
Year of death unknown
Year of birth missing
Indian male poets